Sergio Vázquez García (born 6 October 1967) is a Mexican politician affiliated to the National Action Party. In 2003, he was elected as deputy of the LIX Legislature of the Mexican Congress representing Jalisco.

References

1967 births
Living people
People from Guadalajara, Jalisco
National Action Party (Mexico) politicians
Deputies of the LIX Legislature of Mexico
Members of the Chamber of Deputies (Mexico) for Jalisco